Jesper Mikkelsen (born 26 July 1980) is a former Danish footballer who plays as a left back for Danish Superliga side Silkeborg IF.

Mikkelsen made his breakthrough with Danish Superliga side FC Midtjylland, playing 179 games for the club from 2000 to 2007. He played six months with Superliga rivals Esbjerg fB, before moving abroad to join French club Troyes AC. In May 2010, he signed a two-year deal with Superliga club Silkeborg IF.

References

External links

 Danish Superliga statistics
 
 

1980 births
Living people
Danish men's footballers
FC Midtjylland players
Esbjerg fB players
Danish Superliga players
ES Troyes AC players
Ikast FS players
Association football midfielders
Association football defenders
People from Hillerød Municipality
Sportspeople from the Capital Region of Denmark